Shiligan (also Romanized as Shīlīgān; also known as Shīlgān) is a village in Dibaj Rural District, Lotfabad District, Dargaz County, Razavi Khorasan Province, Iran. At the 2006 census, its population was 756, in 215 families.

References 

Populated places in Dargaz County